The Shalë is a river flowing inside the Albanian Alps in northern Albania. Its source is in the Albanian Alps, near the village Theth, close to the border with Montenegro. The Shalë flows generally south through the municipal units Shalë, Shosh and Temal. It flows into the Koman Reservoir, fed and drained by the river Drin, near the village Telum.
It has a length of 37 km from the source at the top of Radohina to Dri, it springs at the source of Shtraza at the top of Theth village, at the foot of the top of Radohina, from where it descends down through the valley of Shala, from Thethi, Ndërlysa and Musha, from Breg-Lumi to Porta e Shalës (Gorge of Rrshqëm), through Lotaj and in the valley of Shoshi, while its discharge goes to Lesniqe in Dri (today Lake Koman) . It is a mountain river with an average drop of 22 meters in one kilometer.

Shala River is distinguished by its crystalline water, with an average annual flow of about 34 m³ / sec. The maximum inflows reach in November with 52m3 / sec, while the minimum inflows in August in which it reaches 9m³ / sec. The Shala River is rich in a variety of fish, but the most widespread is trout, which grows only in freshwater.

The cool blue color of the water is characteristic of this river, the steep cliffs that surround it, seem to touch the sky by hand. In the river Shala there is a rare beauty, where it is difficult to say only in words. The Shala River in the years of democracy has become a tourist destination for both foreigners and locals, from where many visitors describe it as the pearl of the beauties of Koman and Albania.

See also  
 
 Geography of Albania
 Northern Mountain Range
 Rivers of Albania

References 

Rivers of Albania
Geography of Shkodër County
Valbonë Valley National Park
Braided rivers in Albania